Two is the second album by American alternative metal band Earshot, released on June 22, 2004. The album would go on to spawn commercial success with the album's first single "Wait" being featured in multiple video games, the album's second single "Someone", as well as garnering significant radio airplay. Studio work on the album began in 2003 after extensive touring in 2002. Two reached #127 on the Billboard 200.

"Wait" became the album's lead single. Although it did not chart as well as the band's debut single "Get Away" from their Letting Go album, "Wait" is considered a breakthrough hit for the band and helped launch them into further mainstream success. It was featured on various soundtracks and made appearances in other media as well. Its music video was also rather successful.

Earshot appeared on Headbangers Ball in promotion of Two. In early 2005, they returned from the road in support of their second release and left their record label.

Track listing

Personnel
 Wil Martin – Vocals/Guitar
 Scott Kohler – Guitar
 Mike Callahan – Guitar
 Johnny Sprague – Bass
 Chas Stumbo – Drums

Additional musicians
 Matt Walker
 Dave Moreno

Production
 Johnny K - Producer
 Rich Costey - Mixing
 Howie Weinberg - Mastering

Chart positions

Album

Singles

Appearances
The song "Wait" was featured in the video games Madden NFL 2005 in 2004 and MX vs. ATV Unleashed in 2005.
The song "Down" was featured in the video game Gretzky NHL 2005 in 2004 and the trailer in Madden NFL 2005 in 2004.

References 

2004 albums
Earshot albums
Warner Records albums